Julián Volio Llorente (February 17, 1827 – November 26, 1889) was a Costa Rican politician.

Vice presidents of Costa Rica
1827 births
1889 deaths
Foreign ministers of Costa Rica